The Lower Exum Ridge Route is the lower section of a technical rock climbing route up the Grand Teton's Exum Ridge in Wyoming.  This section is often bypassed on hiking terrain by climbers who wish to do only the technically easier Upper Exum Ridge Route.  The complete route is listed as the Direct Exum Ridge Route in Fifty Classic Climbs of North America.

References

External links 
summitpost.org
rockclimbing.com
mountainproject.com

Climbing routes
Grand Teton National Park